Oliver Gibson (born 28 June 1934 in Beragh, County Tyrone, Northern Ireland, died 27 April 2018 in Ballymoney, County Antrim, Northern Ireland) was a founding member of the Democratic Unionist Party (DUP).

Gibson was a retired DUP councillor for West Tyrone. He also served as an MLA for West Tyrone in the first session of the Assembly. He was a former teacher and was an officer in the Ulster Defence Regiment. His niece, Esther Gibson, was one of the 29 victims killed in the 1998 Omagh bombing.

In 1999, David Jordan, a former Ulster Defence Regiment soldier, broke down in a bar and claimed to be part of a patrol that killed a nationalist councillor, Patsy Kelly, in 1974. Jordan reportedly implicated Gibson in the murder. Jordan was never formally questioned in relation to the matter and no charges were ever brought against Gibson.

In 2003, it emerged that Gibson was having an affair with his 35-year-old secretary Audrey McKenzie and was living with her in Ballybogy, County Antrim. His wife confirmed that he had left her and was no longer living in their Sixmilecross home. He retired as a councillor in Omagh District Council shortly afterwards.

External links
 Gibsons' NI Assembly biography
 Local Government Staff Commission for Northern Ireland website

References

1934 births
2018 deaths
Members of Omagh District Council
Alumni of Queen's University Belfast
Ulster Defence Regiment officers
Democratic Unionist Party MLAs
Members of the Northern Ireland Forum
Northern Ireland MLAs 1998–2003
Politicians from County Tyrone
Educators from Northern Ireland